KS Promień Żary is a football club based in Żary, Poland.

External links 
 
KS Promień Żary at the 90minut.pl website

References

Association football clubs established in 1945
1945 establishments in Poland
Football clubs in Poland
Football clubs in Lubusz Voivodeship
Żary County